Cesm or CSEM may refer to:
 CSEM, School of Computer Science, Engineering and Mathematics, Flinders University
 Csém, a village in Hungary
 Swiss Center for Electronics and Microtechnology, a Swiss research and development company
 Controlled source electro-magnetic, an offshore geophysical technique